The Canterville Ghost (also The Ghost of Canterville) is an opera by the Russian composer Alexander Knaifel in three acts for 18 singers and chamber orchestra, also in an abridged version for two soloists and chamber orchestra.

The opera was composed in 1965–66 to the libretto by Tatiana Kramarova after the 1887 short story "The Canterville Ghost" by Oscar Wilde. Text Russian (translated into English by V. Paperno). It is dedicated to the composer .

Also: Romantic Scenes from the Opera – in seven scenes with prologue for basso profondo and light soprano with chamber orchestra (shorter version). Duration: 90 minutes.

Cast, orchestra

Shorter version:
Solo voices: bass, soprano
Orchestra: flute, oboe, 2 clarinets (piccolo and bass), contrabassoon, horn, trumpet, trombone, tuba, timpani, 4 percussion (tubular bells, glockenspiel, xylophone, flexatone), piano/celesta, organ (may be on tape), 5 strings (1.1.1.1.1).

The score is published by Sovetsky Kompozitor, Leningrad 1977.

Full version:
Singers: 6 sopranos, 2 boy sopranos, 4 mezzo-sopranos, alto, 2 tenors, 2 baritones, bass
Orchestra: flute, oboe, 2 clarinets (piccolo and bass), contrabassoon, horn, trumpet, trombone, tuba, timpani, percussion (5 players, instruments include tubular bells, glockenspiel, xylophone and flexatone), piano/celesta, organ (may be on tape), 2 violins, viola, cello, double bass.

Performance history

It was first performed on February 26, 1974, (with the subsequent performances on November 30, and December 15, 1974) in Leningrad, the House of Composers by the Chamber Orchestra of Conservatoire, conducted by L. Gelgrud.

It was performed on March 3 and 4, 1980, in London by the BBC Symphony Orchestra, conducted by Gennady Rozhdestvensky.

Recordings
 The Canterville Ghost - Operatic scenes inspired by Oscar Wilde (shorter version, 50 minutes) Recorded 1990. The Moscow Theater "Forum" Orchestra, Stanislav Suleymanov (bass), Tatiana Monogarova (soprano), Alexander Levental (organ), conductor Michail Jurowski. Issued on CD: Harmonia Mundi Saison Russe / Le Chant du monde 1991; reissued Brilliant Classics 2012.

References

External links
Das Gespenst von Canterville, Hans Sikorski music publishers

Russian-language operas
Operas
1974 operas
Music for orchestra and organ
Chamber operas
Operas based on works by Oscar Wilde